Darevskia alpina is a species of lizard in the family Lacertidae.
It is found in the Greater Caucasus in Georgia and Russia.

References

Darevskia
Reptiles of Russia
Fauna of Georgia (country)
Reptiles described in 1967
Taxa named by Ilya Darevsky
Taxonomy articles created by Polbot